Frank Harper (born 12 December 1962) is an English actor and film producer. He is best known for his "hard man" roles, such as Billy Bright in The Football Factory (2004) and Dog in Lock, Stock and Two Smoking Barrels (1998).

Career
Frank Harper had an early interest in acting and appeared in a play based around football supporters, at the Albany Theatre in Deptford, while he was still at school. He appeared as a white nationalist in South West 9, and as the bank robber in Harry Enfield's film Kevin & Perry Go Large. He was featured in The Streets' music video "Fit but You Know It", and cast as real-life villain Jack Whomes in Rise of the Foot Soldier.

During his career, Harper has appeared on many British TV shows including The Bill, Doctors, Lovejoy and Waking the Dead. He also wrote, directed and starred in the 2012 British film St George's Day.

Personal life
Harper was born at his family home in Downham, South East London. He left school at 16 and worked at Smithfield Market in the City of London for ten years.

He is an ardent Millwall fan. His father, Dave Harper, played for Millwall between 1957 and 1965; Dave once scored to knock Fulham, then in the First Division, out of the FA Cup.

Filmography

Films

TV

References

External links
 
 Frank Harper at Myspace

1962 births
Living people
English film producers
English male film actors
English male television actors
Male actors from London